Aram A. Avakian (April 23, 1926 – January 17, 1987) was an American film editor and director. His work in the latter role includes Jazz on a Summer's Day (1959) and the indie film  End of the Road (1970).

Life and work 
Aram "Al" Avakian was born in Manhattan, New York, in 1926 to Armenian parents from Iran and Soviet Georgia. He graduated  Horace Mann School and Yale University before serving as a Naval officer on an aircraft carrier in the Pacific. On the G.I. Bill after the war he went to France where he attended the Sorbonne. There he was part of a tight group of young friends who defined the American literary movement of 1950's Paris, including Terry Southern, William Styron, John P. Marquand, and George Plimpton. In 1953, Avakian returned to the United States and apprenticed under Gjon Mili who got him started in documentary editing. In his spare time Avakian took still photographs of the legendary jazz sessions his brother the jazz producer George Avakian recorded. From 1955 to 1958, Avakian was the editor of Edward R. Murrow's program See It Now. In his book Vanity of Duluoz, Jack Kerouac based the character of Charlie on Aram Avakian.

He soon became a feature film editor and director. In 1958, he co-directed with Bert Stern, a filmed record of the Newport Jazz Festival. The result, Jazz on a Summer's Day (1959), which Avakian also edited, is credited with being "the first feature-film documentary of a music festival." He edited the feature film Girl of the Night (1960), "acknowledged for its early use of the freeze frame and the jump cut" in American films. His credits as an editor also included Robert Frank's O.K. End Here (1960), Arthur Penn's The Miracle Worker (1962), Robert Rossen's Lilith (1964), Penn's Mickey One (1965), in which Avakian also plays the disembodied voice of Warren Beatty's tormentor, and Jerry Schatzberg's Honeysuckle Rose (1979).

Avakian directed the movie End of the Road (1970), which received an "X" rating for its graphic depiction of an abortion. For End of the Road, Avakian received the Golden Leopard Award at the Locarno International Film Festival. LIFE magazine's November 7, 1969, issue covered the film in a spectacular 9-page article, and in-depth interviews ran in Esquire and Playboy. In a review of the film in The New York Times, Roger Greenspun wrote of End of the Road: "The precise truth of, say, 5 in a summer afternoon on the lawn of an assistant professor in a small country college has perhaps never been caught in a commercial movie before -- but that is the kind of precise truth this movie captures again and again." The film stars James Earl Jones, Stacy Keach, Dorothy Tristan, and Harris Yulin. In the film Avakian plays The Landlord, The Pigman, and the voice of the psychiatrist on the phone. George Avakian oversaw the music. Avakian's old friend, the novelist Terry Southern, co-produced the film, and co-wrote the screenplay with Avakian and Dennis McGuire.

End of the Road is an early indie picture which bucked Hollywood conventions and was before its time. Many of the cast and crew went on to distinguished film careers. The film is admired by the director Steven Soderbergh, who directed an accompanying documentary on the making of the film on the Warner Bros. DVD, titled "An Amazing Time: Conversations About End of the Road",
released on Sept. 18, 2012, as part of a series of great rediscovered movies. Cineaste published this 1980's interview in advance of the 2012 DVD release: 

Having worked as Francis Ford Coppola's editor on You're a Big Boy Now (1966) Avakian was brought on as the original editor of The Godfather (1972). However, problems arose between the two, with reports that Avakian was intentionally sabotaging the dailies being sent to the studio or at the very least bad-mouthing Coppola's abilities in order to hopefully replace him as director. While Paramount executive Jack Ballard was in favor of the replacement, ultimately head of production Robert Evans continued to back Coppola and Avakian was fired.

Avakian directed Cops and Robbers (1973), One Night Stands and 11 Harrowhouse (1974). and a lost film made in Paris, in French, in the early 1970s.

From 1983 through 1986, Avakian was chairman of the film department at State University of New York at Purchase.
Arthur Penn spoke at Avakian's 1987 memorial. Francis Coppola and Terry Southern wrote letters about Avakian, which were read aloud, and Gerry Mulligan played his saxophone, as well as others. It was a packed house at the New York City Armenian cathedral.

For fifteen years, Avakian was married to actress and writer Dorothy Tristan until 1972. During the last two years of his life his companion was former ballerina Allegra Kent. His children with Dorothy Tristan are photojournalist/author Alexandra Avakian and guitarist Tristan Avakian.

Selected filmography

As editor (partial list)
 Jazz on a Summer's Day (1959)
 Girl of the Night (1960)
 The Miracle Worker (1962)
 Lilith (1964)
 Mickey One (1965)
 You're a Big Boy Now (1966)
 The Comedians (1967)
 The Next Man (1976)
 Honeysuckle Rose (1980)

As director (partial list) 
 Jazz on a Summer's Day (with Bert Stern) (1959)
 Lad, A Dog (with Leslie H. Martinson) (1962)
 One Night Stands (1967) (Documentary)
 End of the Road (1970)
 Cops and Robbers (1973)
 11 Harrowhouse (1974)

References

External links
 Aram Avakian Website
 

1926 births
1987 deaths
American film editors
Horace Mann School alumni
Film directors from New York City
Yale University alumni
American people of Armenian descent
American people of Iranian descent
Iranian people of Armenian descent